Six athletes from Trinidad and Tobago competed at the 1988 Summer Olympics in Seoul, South Korea. Three track and field athletes, two cyclists and one swimmer represented the Caribbean nation.

Competitors
The following is the list of number of competitors in the Games.

Athletics

 Patrick Delice
 Ian Morris
 Angela Williams

Cycling

Two cyclists represented Trinidad and Tobago in 1988.

Men's sprint
 Maxwell Cheeseman

Men's 1 km time trial
 Gene Samuel

Men's points race
 Gene Samuel

Swimming

Women's 50m Freestyle
 Karen Dieffenthaler
 Heat – 27.27 (→ did not advance, 28th place)

Women's 100m Freestyle
 Karen Dieffenthaler
 Heat – 58.64 (→ did not advance, 35th place)

Women's 200m Freestyle
 Karen Dieffenthaler
 Heat – 2:07.09 (→ did not advance, 31st place)

References

External links
Official Olympic Reports
International Olympic Committee results database

Nations at the 1988 Summer Olympics
1988
Summer Olympics